Orlando Tobias Edward Higginbottom (born 7 March 1986), known professionally as Totally Enormous Extinct Dinosaurs (or TEED), is a British electronic music producer, DJ and singer-songwriter based in the United States.

Early life
Orlando is the son of Professor Edward Higginbottom, formerly conductor of the choir of New College, Oxford. He was educated at Abingdon School and Cherwell School, Oxford. A classically trained musician, he attended the Junior Royal Academy of Music in London. Orlando began listening to electronic music in his early teens, through borrowing audio tapes from his older siblings.

Orlando commented to Spin that he was looking for a name that "couldn't be cool, couldn't be put into some kind of scene that gets hip for six months and then falls out of fashion."

Musical career
On 11 June 2012 TEED's debut album Trouble was released by Polydor Records. The album was well received, with favourable reviews from several well-respected music publications including the NME ("One of the UK's most exciting young producers"), Pitchfork and the BBC. iTunes UK named Trouble as their 'Debut Electronic album of the year', was DJ Magazine's 'album of the year' and it was number 5 in the BBC's end of year album poll.

Trouble was also voted 'Best Album' in DJ Magazine's Best of British 2012, with TEED also picking up the award for 'Best Live Act'.

On 8 July 2013, Crosstown Rebels released Get Lost VI, a compilation of music curated and mixed by Totally Enormous Extinct Dinosaurs. Get Lost VI featured tracks from Underground Resistance, Tiga, Breach, Trus'me, Axel Boman, Dave Aju, Mathew Jonson and more. It was voted 'Best Compilation' in DJ Magazine's Best of British 2013.

On 14 August 2014, TEED launched Nice Age, a cross-platform label. The first release, "Feels Like", is a collaboration between TEED and Anna Lunoe.

TEED released an EP titled The Distance in 2021.

On 30 March 2022, Totally Enormous Extinct Dinosaurs announced his second album When The Lights Go, which was supposed to be released on 22nd July 2022, but it was delayed to 9th September 2022 and was released on his own label, Nice Age.

Discography

Studio albums

Extended plays
All in One Sixty Dancehalls (2009), Greco-Roman
All in Two Sixty Dancehalls (2010), Greco-Roman
Household Goods (2010), Greco-Roman
Prehistory (2011), Greco-Roman
Prehistory II (2011), Greco-Roman
I Can Hear the Birds (2020), I Oh You
The Distance (2021), Nice Age

Singles

As lead artist

Featured appearances

Other albums
Kinshasa One Two (2012), Warp

Songwriting and production credits

Remixes

See also
 List of Old Abingdonians

References

External links

1986 births
Living people
People educated at Abingdon School
DJs from London
Electronic dance music DJs
English DJs
English electronic musicians
English house musicians
English record producers
Nu-disco musicians
Remixers